Boreocingula castanea is a species of minute sea snail, a marine gastropod mollusk or micromollusk in the family Rissoidae.

Distribution

Description 
The maximum recorded shell length is 4.8 mm.

Habitat 
Minimum recorded depth is 2 m. Maximum recorded depth is 150 m.

References

Rissoidae
Gastropods described in 1842